Alope (ancient Greek: Αλόπη) may refer to:
 Alope, a mythological figure
 Alope (spring), a spring and monument to Alope, the mythological figure
 Alope (Opuntian Locris), a town of ancient Locris
 Alope (Ozolian Locris), a town of ancient Locris
 Alope (Thessaly), a town of ancient Thessaly
 Alope, older name of Ephesus, an ancient city in Asia Minor
 Alope, older name of Lycia, a historical region in Asia Minor
 Alope (crustacean), a shrimp genus in the family Hippolytidae